Samuel Somerville Stratton (February 23, 1898 – March 1969) served as the eleventh president of Middlebury College, 1943 - 1963.

Born in Lynn, Massachusetts, he was a graduate of Newburyport High School in Newburyport, Massachusetts and Dartmouth College, graduating in 1920 after naval service in World War I. He received an M.A. and Ph.D. from Harvard and served as a professor of economics and researcher there and briefly at the University of Pittsburgh.

Stratton saw Middlebury through most of World War II, when the institution hosted Naval V-12 units, and initiated an extensive program of construction while enlarging the student body and enriching the institution's liberal arts curriculum.

References

1898 births
1969 deaths
People from Newburyport, Massachusetts
Dartmouth College alumni
Harvard University alumni
University of Pittsburgh faculty
Presidents of Middlebury College
20th-century American academics